Adam Hugh Vyvyan Johnson (born 28 November 1978) is an English former first-class cricketer.

Johnson was born at Sheffield in November 1978. He was educated at Tapton School, before going up to Jesus College, Cambridge. While studying at Cambridge, he made his debut in first-class cricket for Cambridge UCCE against Kent at Fenner's in 2001. He made three further first-class appearances in 2001, playing twice more for Cambridge UCCE and once for Cambridge University against Oxford University. In his four first-class matches, he scored 72 runs with a high score of 55 not out. In addition to playing first-class cricket he also played minor counties cricket for Cambridgeshire in 1999, making a single appearance in the Minor Counties Championship.

References

External links

1978 births
Living people
Cricketers from Sheffield
People educated at Tapton School
Alumni of Jesus College, Cambridge
English cricketers
Cambridgeshire cricketers
Cambridge MCCU cricketers
Cambridge University cricketers